The 11091/11092 Bhuj - Pune Express is an express train of the Indian Railways connecting Pune in Maharashtra and Bhuj of Kutch. It is currently being operated with 11091/11092 train numbers on a weekly basis.

Coach Composition

The train has standard ICF rakes with max speed of 110 kmph. The train consists of 22 coaches :

 1 AC First Class
 1 AC II Tier
 6 AC III Tier
 10 Sleeper Coaches
 2 General Unreserved
 2 Seating cum Luggage Rake

Service

The 11091/Bhuj - Pune Express has an average speed of 50 km/hr and covers 985 km in 19 hrs 45 mins.

The 11092/Pune - Bhuj Express has an average speed of 51 km/hr and covers 985 km in 19 hrs 30 mins.

As the average speed of the train is below 55 km/hr, its fare does not include a superfast surcharge.

Route and halts

The important halts of the train are:

Schedule

Rake Sharing

The train shares its rake with:

 11087/11088 Veraval - Pune Express
 11089/11090 Bhagat Ki Kothi – Pune Express
 11095/11096 Ahimsa Express
 12103/12104 Pune - Lucknow Superfast Express

Direction Reversal

Train reverses its direction one times at:

Traction

Both trains are hauled by a Vatva Loco Shed based WDP-4 from Bhuj to Ahmedabad and from Ahmedabad it is hauled by a Vadodara Loco Shed based WAP-5 Electric loco shed, Valsad|Valsad]] based WAP4 electric locomotive up til Pune.

Notes

External links 

 11091/Bhuj - Pune Express
 11092/Pune - Bhuj Express

References 

Express trains in India
Rail transport in Maharashtra
Rail transport in Gujarat
Transport in Bhuj
Transport in Pune